Thomas Kimball (September 7, 1942 – May 2, 2017) was an American professional basketball player from Framingham, Massachusetts.

As 6'8" power forward/center at the University of Connecticut, Kimball averaged 18.4 points and 17.9 rebounds over three seasons.  He played in the NBA from 1966 to 1975 as a member of the Boston Celtics, San Diego Rockets, Milwaukee Bucks, Kansas City Kings, Philadelphia 76ers and New Orleans Jazz. Kimball averaged 6.1 points and 6.8 rebounds over his NBA career. His best season was his second, in which he averaged a double double (11.0 points and 11.7 rebounds).. 

Kimball was inducted into the University of Connecticut's "Huskies of Honor" in 2006. His son confirmed via social media that Kimball died on May 2, 2017.

NBA career statistics

Regular season

|-
| align="left" | 1966–67
| align="left" | Boston
| 38 || - || 5.8 || .361 || - || .675 || 3.8 || 0.3 || - || - || 2.6
|-
| align="left" | 1967–68
| align="left" | San Diego
| 81 || - || 31.1 || .396 || - || .592 || 11.7 || 1.8 || - || - || 11.0
|-
| align="left" | 1968–69
| align="left" | San Diego
| 76 || - || 22.1 || .445 || - || .468 || 8.8 || 1.2 || - || - || 7.8
|-
| align="left" | 1969–70
| align="left" | San Diego
| 77 || - || 21.1 || .429 || - || .578 || 8.1 || 1.2 || - || - || 7.1
|-
| align="left" | 1970–71
| align="left" | San Diego
| 80 || - || 13.8 || .387 || - || .472 || 5.1 || 0.8 || - || - || 3.4
|-
| align="left" | 1971–72
| align="left" | Milwaukee
| 74 || - || 13.1 || .467 || - || .543 || 4.2 || 0.8 || - || - || 3.5
|-
| align="left" | 1972–73
| align="left" | Kansas City-Omaha
| 67 || - || 9.6 || .436 || - || .657 || 2.9 || 0.4 || - || - || 3.5
|-
| align="left" | 1973–74
| align="left" | Philadelphia
| 75 || - || 21.2 || .474 || - || .686 || 7.4 || 1.0 || 0.7 || 0.3 || 7.5
|-
| align="left" | 1974–75
| align="left" | New Orleans
| 3 || - || 30.0 || .304 || - || .857 || 8.7 || 1.3 || 0.7 || 0.0 || 6.7
|- class="sortbottom"
| style="text-align:center;" colspan="2"| Career
| 571 || - || 18.3 || .425 || - || .573 || 6.8 || 1.0 || 0.7 || 0.3 || 6.1
|}

Playoffs

|-
| align="left" | 1966–67
| align="left" | Boston
| 1 || - || 4.0 || .000 || - || .000 || 3.0 || 0.0 || - || - || 0.0
|-
| align="left" | 1968–69
| align="left" | San Diego
| 6 || - || 32.8 || .434 || - || .520 || 12.3 || 0.7 || - || - || 9.8
|-
| align="left" | 1971–72
| align="left" | Milwaukee
| 7 || - || 5.1 || .417 || - || 1.000 || 0.9 || 0.3 || - || - || 1.7
|- class="sortbottom"
| style="text-align:center;" colspan="2"| Career
| 14 || - || 16.9 || .418 || - || .556 || 5.9 || 0.4 || - || - || 5.1
|}

See also
 List of NCAA Division I men's basketball season rebounding leaders

References

1942 births
2017 deaths
American expatriate basketball people in Italy
American men's basketball players
Basketball players from Massachusetts
Belmont Hill School alumni
Boston Celtics draft picks
Boston Celtics players
Kansas City Kings players
Milwaukee Bucks players
New Orleans Jazz expansion draft picks
New Orleans Jazz players
Philadelphia 76ers players
Power forwards (basketball)
San Diego Rockets expansion draft picks
San Diego Rockets players
Sportspeople from Framingham, Massachusetts
UConn Huskies men's basketball players